Kunama Raju Palem is a village in the Chittoor district of Andhra Pradesh, India. It is 10 kilometers away from Nagari. The population is approximately 1,700. There is a sub-community called Malada. The population there consists largely of the scheduled castes.

References 

Villages in Chittoor district